Jadwiga Książek (born 6 April 1939, died 30 January 2019) was a Polish volleyball player, a member of Poland women's national volleyball team in 1959–1969, a bronze medalist of the Olympic Games (Tokyo 1964, Mexico 1968), a bronze medalist of the World Championship 1962 and silver medalist of the European Championship 1963, three-time Polish Champion (1964, 1965, 1966).

External links
 

1939 births
2019 deaths
Olympic volleyball players of Poland
Volleyball players at the 1964 Summer Olympics
Volleyball players at the 1968 Summer Olympics
Olympic bronze medalists for Poland
Polish women's volleyball players
Olympic medalists in volleyball
People from Sejny County
Sportspeople from Podlaskie Voivodeship
Medalists at the 1968 Summer Olympics
Medalists at the 1964 Summer Olympics